Charlton Marshall Halt was a station in the English county of Dorset. It was located between Blandford Forum and Bailey Gate  on the Somerset and Dorset Joint Railway. The station consisted of two short platforms and shelters.

History

The station was opened on 5 July 1928 by the Southern Railway.   It became part of the Southern Region of British Railways when the railways were nationalised in 1948. The halt was closed in 1956 as part of an economy campaign. It was also used by special trains for Clayesmore Preparatory School until the last such usage on 17 December 1963. There were 2 carriages which started from Waterloo attached to one of the regular main line trains and these carriages were un-coupled from the main line train and coupled to a local train to go to Charlton Marshall Halt. There was a train at the beginning and end of each school term. So there were 6 trains that stopped at the halt every year. Trains continued to pass the site until the S&DJR closed in 1966.

Track was finally lifted in 1969, as the railway was still open until the closure of the goods terminal at Blandford that year. The site was in a cutting, which now 
part of a footpath and bridleway.

References

 
 
 
 Station on navigable O.S. map

External links
https://web.archive.org/web/20090107031846/http://www.sdjr.net/locations/charlton_marshall.html
http://www.geograph.org.uk/photo/22206

Disused railway stations in Dorset
Former Somerset and Dorset Joint Railway stations
Railway stations in Great Britain opened in 1928
Railway stations in Great Britain closed in 1956